Jonas Carl Greenfield (October 20, 1926 in New York City – March 13, 1995 in Jerusalem) was an American scholar of Semitic languages, who published in the fields of Semitic Epigraphy, Aramaic Studies and Qumran Studies, and a distinguished member of the Israel Academy of Sciences and Humanities.

Greenfield studied at Yale, receiving a Master of Arts in 1951 and his doctorate in 1956 (with a dissertation on "The Lexical Status of Mishnaic Hebrew"). He taught at Brandeis University (1954–56), University of California, Los Angeles (1956–1965), the University of California, Berkeley (1965–71), and the Hebrew University of Jerusalem (1971–1995). In 1990 he became Caspar Levias Professor of Ancient Semitic Languages at the Hebrew University.

He was a member of the committee of translators of the Ketuvim (the "Writings") for the New JPS Translation of the Tanakh.

In 1995 a festschrift was published in his honor, Solving Riddles and Untying Knots. Biblical, Epigraphic, and Semitic Studies in Honor of Jonas C. Greenfield. In 2000 the American Oriental Society established a prize to honor his memory, the "Jonas C. Greenfield Prize For Younger Semitists". The Orion Center for the Study of the Dead Sea Scrolls and Associated Literature, Hebrew University, Jerusalem, has held the Jonas C. Greenfield Scholars’ Seminar since 1999. Israel Exploration Journal 45 no. 2–3 (1995) 61–200 was issued as the "Jonas C. Greenfield Memorial Volume." Obituaries, in addition to the latter, pages 83–84, include Ziony Zevit, Bulletin of the American Schools of Oriental Research 298 (May 1995) 3–5 and Mark S. Smith, American Schools of Oriental Research Newsletter 45 no. 1 (Spring 1995) 1–2. For an appreciation of his work on Qumran and related texts see Baruch A. Levine, "The Contribution of Jonas Greenfield to the Study of Dead Sea Literature." Dead Sea Discoveries, Vol. 3, No. 1 (Mar. 1996), pp. 2–9

Selected works

Books

Shorter writings
   in 2 vols

Chapters and articles

Festschrift

Footnotes

20th-century American Jews
Brandeis University faculty
University of California, Los Angeles faculty
University of California, Berkeley faculty
Academic staff of the Hebrew University of Jerusalem
Members of the Israel Academy of Sciences and Humanities
American Hebraists
Dead Sea Scrolls
1926 births
1995 deaths
Yale University alumni
Old Testament scholars
Translators from Mandaic